A Tachycardia is the medical term as in Supraventricular tachycardia.

Tachycardia may also refer to:

Tachycardia: A Journal, an online book by Satsvarupa dasa Goswami